The Boys and Mrs B is a 1977 British comedy television special. Written by Ronald Chesney and Ronald Wolfe, it was originally intended as pilot for a sitcom but was made as a one off special. It was produced and directed by Dennis Main Wilson with a cast of established and upcoming comedy actors.

Plot 
Mrs. Battley runs a youth center for the local authority but has trouble controlling the boys, who have hired a stripper to appear at a fundraising event.

Production and broadcast 
Ronald Chesney and Ronald Wolfe, creators of successful comedy series such as The Rag Trade and On The Buses, pitched the idea of a sitcom set in a youth club to Dennis Main Wilson in 1976. The aim was a series that would appeal to a teenage and young adult audience, and be a vehicle for young comedy actors. A pilot was commissioned, however only days before it was to be recorded the BBC decided not to proceed with a series. With only very minor changes to the script it was made as a one off television special.

The special was recorded in February 1977 and the original broadcast was on 26 April at 7.40pm on BBC One in London.

Cast 
 Thora Hird as Mrs. Battley
 Tony Robinson as Mark
 Herbert Norville as Nick
 Sue Upton as Jackie
 Richard Caldicot as Councillor Cooper
 Gorden Kaye as Mr. Hobkirk
 Luan Peters as Ingrid

References

External links 
 

1977 television specials
British television specials
British comedy films
1970s British films